Andreas Pfaltz (born 10 May 1948) is a Swiss chemist known for his work in the area of coordination chemistry and catalysis.

Education and professional life
Andreas Pfaltz studied at ETH Zurich, completing his undergraduate diploma in natural sciences in 1972 and his PhD in organic chemistry in 1978. His doctoral supervisor was Albert Eschenmoser, whose research into vitamin B12 and other corrin rings would influence Pfaltz's early research. Following a two-year postdoctoral position at Columbia University (early 1978 – late 1979), working for Gilbert Stork on the synthesis of Rifamycin, he returned to ETH Zurich as a lecturer and began his own research. In 1990 he was appointed as an associate professor at the University of Basel, becoming a full professor in 1993. Between 1995 and 1998 he was a director of the prestigious Max Planck Institute for Coal Research, afterwards returning to the University of Basel, where he has remained till the present day.

Research
Pfaltz's early research was influenced by his PhD supervisor Albert Eschenmoser and was largely based around the synthesis of corrins, porphyrins and other macrocycles. During the second half of the 1980s he began to use fragments of these macrocycles as novel ligands for asymmetric catalysis, with chiral C2-symmetric semicorrins being the most successful example. Following the development of structurally related bis(oxazoline)s Pfaltz began using and developing various oxazoline based ligands, making significant contributions to the known chemistry of phosphinooxazolines. His current research activities remain focused on ligand development, asymmetric catalysis and catalyst screening.

Professional appointments
 Scientific staff member, ETH Zürich, 1980–1986 
 Privatdozent (lecturer), ETH Zürich, 1987–1990 
 Associate professor, University of Basel, 1990–1993 
 Professor of organic chemistry, University of Basel, 1993–1995 
 Head of the Homogeneous Catalysis Section, Max Planck Institute for Coal Research, 1995–1998 
 Professor of chemistry, University of Basel, 1999–2015
 Professor emeritus, University of Basel, 2015–present

Awards
 Werner Prize of the Swiss Chemical Society, 1989 
 Wilhelm Manchot Research Professorship, TU München, 2002 
 Horst-Pracejus-Prize of the German Chemical Society, 2003 
 Prelog Medal of the ETH Zürich, 2003 
 Ryoji Noyori Prize, The Society of Synthetic Organic Chemistry, Japan, 2008
 Heilbronner-Hückel Lecturer, Swiss Chemical Society and German Chemical Society, 2011
 Member of The German Academy of Sciences "Leopoldina", 2011
 Yamada-Koga Prize, Japan Research Foundation of Optically Active Compounds, 2011
 President of the Bürgenstock conference, 2012
 Chirality Medal, (2016)

References

Swiss chemists
ETH Zurich alumni
Academic staff of the University of Basel
1948 births
Living people
Members of the German Academy of Sciences Leopoldina
Max Planck Institute directors